Richard Wight was an Anglican priest in Ireland in the 18th century.

Wight was educated at Trinity College, Dublin. He was a prebendary of Ballycahane in Limerick Cathedral from 1715 to 1720;  and then of Killeedy from 1720 to 1740; archdeacon of Limerick from 1740 to 1751;  and prebendary of St. Munchin's in Limerick Cathedral from 1754 until his death in 1762.

References

Archdeacons of Limerick
Alumni of Trinity College Dublin
18th-century Irish Anglican priests
1762 deaths